Louisa Noel Krause (born May 20, 1986) is an American actress. After studying drama in college, Krause appeared in numerous off-Broadway productions while also appearing in episodes of New York-based network television series. Her first film role was in The Babysitters (2007). In 2017, Krause appeared in the lead role of Anna Garner in the television series The Girlfriend Experience.

Early life
Krause was born May 20, 1986 in Falls Church, Virginia. Her father is of half-Japanese descent (from Okinawa, Japan) and her mother is American. She has a younger brother named Nathaniel who is a director. She began her interest in the arts at a young age by studying dance at the Washington School of Ballet in Washington D.C. Once Krause entered high school, dance took a back seat when she started performing in a variety of plays and musicals including Side Show as Violet Hilton, Gypsy as Mama Rose, and Equus as Dora Strang. After high school, she enrolled in the  Carnegie Mellon Drama School. Soon after, Krause felt she was ready to start her professional career as an actress. She earned her Equity card by performing in a summer-stock production of Aida.

Career
Krause began her career in theatre, appearing in numerous off-Broadway productions. In 2006, Krause appeared in the Huntington Theatre Company's production of Les Liaisons Dangereuses. In 2007, she starred in the Signature Theatre Company's production of Iphigenia 2.o, in the lead role of Iphigenia. That same year, Krause starred in the world premiere of In a Dark Dark House, at the Lucille Lortel Theatre, June 7 – July 7, 2007. She has continued working on stage, appearing in 2013 as Rose in the world premiere of Annie Baker's The Flick at Playwrights Horizons, a role she reprised two years later for a second run at the Barrow Street Theatre and later the National Theatre.

Her first film credits came in 2007 with supporting roles in The Speed of Life and The Babysitters. In 2009, she appeared in the films Taking Woodstock and Toe to Toe. She is known for her work in independent cinema and has appeared in several short films. Krause gained more prominence with a  role in the 2011 feature film Young Adult, in which her perfectly low pitched comedic scene as the ennuied clerk at the hotel where Charlize Theron's character is staying was used for promotional purposes and played in the trailer and TV spots for the film. Krause also made an appearance as a cult member in the 2011 film Martha Marcy May Marlene – a film she became involved with through her work with the Sundance Film Festival.

In 2012, Krause played a role in the film Return and played the lead role in the independent film King Kelly, which opened at South by Southwest. In 2012 she filmed a supporting role in the indie film Bluebird, released in 2015. She also played a supporting role in the 2014 independent film, The Mend, which premiered at South by Southwest.

Krause has appeared in several television roles, including in the Law & Order episode "Angelgrove" in 2008 as Brenda Tannerman, in Law & Order: Criminal Intent in the episode "Loyalty: Part 1" in 2010 as Jolie, and in Blue Bloods in the 2011 episode "Silver Star" as Kimberly. In 2017, Krause played Anna Carr/Garner, one of the lead roles in the second season of the anthology television series The Girlfriend Experience.

Filmography

Film

Television

References

External links

 

1986 births
American actresses of Japanese descent
American film actors of Asian descent
American people of Okinawan descent
American film actresses
American stage actresses
American television actresses
Actresses from Virginia
Carnegie Mellon University College of Fine Arts alumni
Living people
People from Falls Church, Virginia
21st-century American actresses